C. spicata may refer to:
 Calycadenia spicata Greene – the spiked western rosinweed
 Carex spicata Huds. – a species of sedge
 Corylopsis spicata Siebold & Zucc. – the winter hazel, a species of witch hazel
 Cussonia spicata Thunb. – the spiked cabbage tree, lowveld cabbage tree or common cabbage tree

See also
 Spicata (disambiguation)